Malaysia first competed at the Asian Games in 1954. Malaysia got its first gold medal in 1962 Asian Games, when Mani Jegathesan won the men's 200 metres athletics event on 28 August 1962.

Asian Games

Medals by Games

Medals by sport

Medals by individual

Records

Key
 WR = World record
 GR = Games record
 AS = Asian record
 NR = National record

Asian Winter Games

Medals by Games

Asian Indoor and Martial Arts Games

Medals by Games

Medals by sport

Asian Beach Games

Medals by Games

Medals by sport

Asian Youth Games

Medals by Games

Medals by sport

Other Appearances
Includes Malaysia participation and results in Southeast Asian and inter-continental level competitions such as Southeast Asian Games, ASEAN Para Games, ASEAN University Games, ASEAN School Games, Afro-Asian Games, FESPIC Games, and FESPIC Youth Games.

Southeast Asian Games

*Red border color indicates tournament was held on home soil.

Medals by Games

Medals by sport

Medals by individual

ASEAN University Games

*Red border color indicates tournament was held on home soil.

Medals by Games

ASEAN School Games

*Red border color indicates tournament was held on home soil.

Medals by Games

ASEAN Para Games

*Red border color indicates tournament was held on home soil.

Medals by Games

Afro-Asian Games

Medals by Games

FESPIC Games

*Red border color indicates tournament was held on home soil.

Medals by Games

FESPIC Youth Games

Medals by Games

See also
 Malaysia at the Olympics
 Malaysia at the Paralympics
 Malaysia at the Asian Para Games
 Malaysia at the Southeast Asian Games
 Malaysia at the Commonwealth Games

References